Military conscription has never applied in Ireland (both Northern Ireland and Republic of Ireland). The Defence Forces are the armed forces of the Republic of Ireland, and serves as an all-volunteer military. Irish neutrality means Ireland has been neutral in international relations since the 1930s, though it has participated in United Nations peacekeeping missions.

History
Impressment of Irish sailors into the English and British Navy was practised in the 17th and 18th centuries. It occurred in Cromwell's Commonwealth and under Charles II; after the Williamite War it stopped, but recurred in later wars. The ranks of the Irish Militia, formed in 1793 for defence during the Napoleonic Wars, were supposed to be filled by local "ballots" (lotteries), but widespread violent opposition prompted an amendment to allow "fines", levied by parish and used to pay volunteer replacements.

The Irish Volunteers founded in 1913 took the name of the 18th-century Irish Volunteers; both militias saw the free choice of their members to participate as a source of pride. The term "volunteer" is used as a title for members by physical force Irish republican paramilitary groups descended from or inspired by the Irish Volunteers, like the Irish Republican Army.

The Conscription Crisis of 1918 arose when Lloyd George's UK government attempted to extend to Ireland the conscription which was already in place in Great Britain because of the First World War. The Mansion House Conference to oppose conscription was organised by Irish nationalists, including  Sinn Féin, the Irish Parliamentary Party and the Catholic hierarchy. Sinn Féin's perceived leading role helped it to win most Irish seats in the 1918 general election.

During the Second World War, the Irish state remained neutral and under a state of emergency. The Emergency Powers Act 1939 gave the government sweeping powers to bypass the Oireachtas (parliament) and the Constitution for the duration of "the Emergency". However, both military conscription and industrial conscription were excluded from the scope of the act by a section added at committee stage.

In May 1941, there were reports that Churchill's UK government was considering extending to Northern Ireland the conscription which was already in place in Great Britain because of the Second World War.  On 26 May, the 10th Dáil was recalled for a special sitting to protest. On 27 May, Winston Churchill told the House of Commons "it would be more trouble than it is worth" to introduce it.

Contemporary debate
Many supporters of Irish neutrality oppose the deepening of the Common Security and Defence Policy of the European Union. Supporters of EU integration have accused opponents of stirring rumours about conscription into a European army. Such claims were made regarding the Treaty of Lisbon by some fringe groups during the 2008 referendum campaign and believed by "48% of 'no' voters and remarkably 26% of 'yes' voters".

References

 
Ireland